Daniel Thomas Greaves (born 31 January 1963) is an English former professional footballer who played as a striker. After retiring as a player, Greaves became a football manager, and managed Witham Town.

Career

Playing career
After graduating from Tottenham Hotspur's youth team, Greaves began his senior career with Southend United, making 49 appearances in the Football League between 1981 and 1984. He then spent a season with Cambridge United, making four further appearances in the League, before playing non-League football with Chelmsford City.

Coaching career
After retiring as a player, Greaves became a football manager, and managed Witham Town for a spell. In 2015, he became assistant manager to Steve Tilson at C&K Basildon Ladies F.C.

Personal life
His father Jimmy was also a professional footballer. He is of Irish descent through his father.

References

1963 births
Living people
People from Upminster
Footballers from the London Borough of Havering
English footballers
English people of Irish descent
Tottenham Hotspur F.C. players
Southend United F.C. players
Cambridge United F.C. players
Chelmsford City F.C. players
English Football League players
English football managers
Witham Town F.C. managers
Southend United F.C. non-playing staff
Association football forwards